Francis Cappuccio (August 20, 1931 – September 12, 2017), known professionally as Frank Capp, was an American jazz drummer.  Capp also played on numerous rock and roll sessions and is considered to be a member of The Wrecking Crew.

Biography
Capp was born Francis Cappuccio in Worcester, Massachusetts, United States. He began playing with Stan Kenton in early 1952 and remained with Kenton until the end of that year. He then joined Neal Hefti's group. He often accompanied Peggy Lee on her road dates and subsequently went to Los Angeles where he joined Billy May, and recorded with The Wrecking Crew. He played with Ella Fitzgerald, Harry James, Charlie Barnet, Stan Getz, Art Pepper, and Dave Pell. He recorded often with André Previn's trio (1957-1964), and also made records with Benny Goodman (1958), Terry Gibbs, and Turk Murphy. 

Capp worked steadily on television shows and in the film studios in the 1960s. He spent more than 13 years as drummer for the David Rose Orchestra on The Red Skelton Show. Starting in the 1970s, he recorded extensively in a variety of settings for Concord. Together with Nat Pierce he founded the Capp-Pierce Juggernaut big band in 1975.

In his later years, he resided with his partner Lori Singman in Studio City, California, and performed every Tuesday at Las Hadas Restaurant in Northridge, California, accompanied by his fellow jazz colleagues. In 2016, Capp wrote and published his autobiography Drumming Up Business: My Life in Music.

Frank Capp died in September 2017 in Studio City, at the age of 86.

Selected discography

As leader
With Nat Pierce
Frank Capp & Nat Pierce: Juggernaut (Concord Jazz, 1976)
The Capp-Pierce Juggernaut: Live at the Century Plaza with Joe Williams (Concord Jazz, 1978)
The Frank Capp-Nat Pierce Orchestra: Juggernaut Strikes Again! with Ernie Andrews (Concord Jazz, 1982)
The Capp-Pierce Juggernaut: Live at the Alley Cat with Ernestine Anderson (Concord Jazz, 1987)
With The Frank Capp Juggernaut
In a Hefti Bag (Concord Jazz, 1995)
Play It Again Sam (Concord Jazz, 1997)

As sideman 
With The Beach Boys
 The Beach Boys' Christmas Album (Capitol, 1964)
 Summer Days (And Summer Nights!!) (Capitol, 1965)
 Pet Sounds (Capitol, 1966)
 Sunflower (Capitol, 1970)
 Surf's Up (Capitol, 1971)
 Carl and the Passions – "So Tough" (Capitol, 1972)

With Michael Bublé
 Michael Bublé (Reprise, 2003)
 It's Time (Reprise, 2005)

With Cher
 All I Really Want to Do (Imperial, 1965)
 Chér (Imperial, 1966)

With Stan Kenton
 City of Glass (Capitol, 1951)
 Popular Favorites by Stan Kenton (Capitol, 1953)
 This Modern World (Capitol, 1953)

With André Previn
 King Size! (Contemporary, 1959)
 Dinah Sings, Previn Plays with Dinah Shore (Capitol, 1959)
 Like Previn! (Contemporary, 1960)
 André Previn and J. J. Johnson with J. J. Johnson (Columbia, 1961)
 Duet with Doris Day (Columbia, 1962)

With Bud Shank 
 Girl in Love (World Pacific, 1966)
 Bud Shank Plays Music from Today's Movies (World Pacific, 1967)

With Sonny & Cher
 Look at Us (Atco, 1965)
 In Case You're in Love (Atlantic, 1967)

With others
 Chet Baker, Albert's House (Beverly Hills, 1969)
 Glen Campbell, I Remember Hank Williams (Capitol, 1973)
 John Denver, Earth Songs (Windstar, 1990)
 Jackie DeShannon, Jackie DeShannon (Liberty, 1963)
 Dion DiMucci, Born to Be with You (Phil Spector, 1975)
 The Everly Brothers, The Everly Brothers Sing (Warner Bros., 1967)
 Herbie Harper Quintet, Five Brothers (Tampa, 1955)
 Lena Horne, Lena...Lovely and Alive (RCA Victor, 1962)
 Jack Jones, What I Did For Love (RCA Victor, 1975)
 The Mitchells: Red Mitchell, Whitey Mitchell, Blue Mitchell and André Previn,  Get Those Elephants Out'a Here (MetroJazz, 1958) 
 Walter Murphy, Walter Murphy's Discosymphony (New York, 1979)
 Michael Nesmith, The Wichita Train Whistle Sings (Dot, 1968)
 Jack Nitzsche, Heart Beat (Soundtrack) (Capitol, 1980)
 Anita O'Day, In a Mellow Tone (Kayo, 1989)
 Renee Olstead, Skylark (Reprise, 2009)
 Joe Pass, A Sign of the Times (World Pacific, 1965)
 Shorty Rogers, Shorty Rogers Meets Tarzan (MGM, 1960)
 Nancy Sinatra, Boots (Reprise, 1966)
 Captain & Tennille,  Song of Joy (A&M, 1976)
 Ike & Tina Turner, River Deep – Mountain High (A&M, 1966)
 Ben Webster, The Warm Moods (Reprise, 1961)

Notes

References

External links
New England Jazz History Database
Audio Interviews with Chet Williamson
Frank Capp Interview - NAMM Oral History Library (2016)

1931 births
2017 deaths
Musicians from Worcester, Massachusetts
American session musicians
American jazz drummers
Big band bandleaders
The T-Bones members
The Wrecking Crew (music) members
American jazz percussionists
American jazz vibraphonists
Bongo players
Timpanists
Timbaleros
Tubular bells players
Snare drummers
Tambourine players
Castanets players
Jazz musicians from Massachusetts
The Capp-Pierce Juggernaut members